John Michael Hubert Lee (13 August 1927 – 14 April 2020) was a Labour Party politician in the United Kingdom.

Lee was educated at Reading School, Christ's College, Cambridge and the School of Oriental and African Studies, University of London. He became a barrister, called to the bar in 1960 at Middle Temple. From 1951 to 1958 he worked in the Colonial Service in the Gold Coast, now Ghana. Later he worked in the Ministry of Communications, then in 1959 joined the BBC legal department.

Lee first contested the parliamentary constituency of Reading at the 1964 general election without success, but defeated the Conservative incumbent, Peter Emery, in the 1966 election.  He served as Member of Parliament (MP) for Reading until his defeat at the 1970 election.  He was subsequently MP for Birmingham Handsworth from February 1974 until he stood down at the 1979 election, when he was succeeded by Sheila Wright. He stood broadly on the left of the Labour Party and was a member of the Tribune Group of Labour MPs.

Lee was interviewed in 2012 as part of The History of Parliament's oral history project. By this time he had left the Labour Party, resigning in 2003.

Lee married Margaret Russell in 1960; they had two children. He died on 14 April 2020 at the age of 92.

References

External links 

1927 births
2020 deaths
Alumni of Christ's College, Cambridge
Alumni of SOAS University of London
Labour Party (UK) MPs for English constituencies
Members of the Middle Temple
Members of the Parliament of the United Kingdom for Reading
UK MPs 1966–1970
UK MPs 1974
UK MPs 1974–1979